Mabel of Bury St. Edmunds (13th-century) was an English embroiderer of immense skill.

Mabel was from Bury St. Edmunds. She frequently appeared in the royal records of Henry III as a favoured artisan.

Between the years 1239 and 1245 she appeared in the King’s writs twenty four times. According to Rozsika Parker, Mabel was the last majorly acknowledged woman embroider in England during the period of the middle ages: after this time, medieval histories of embroidery recorded mainly the names of male merchants (regardless of who were the actual artisans in towns and villages).

Chasuble

Mabel was first mentioned in relation to the commission of a chasuble for the King in November 1239. It is assumed that the King was aware of her work prior to this time and that she was already a master of her craft for this was an important commission and would not have been handed out lightly. It is unclear under which conditions Mabel produced her work but evidence points to her having been an “independent producer.” She was not a royal servant nor attached to anyone else’s atelier.

The chasuble took Mabel about two years to finish. As she was finishing her work in 1241, pearls and gold were ordered for her use in decorating the robe. Upon completion, the King commanded an appraisal be made, by knowledgeable people, for the value of the finished work as well as an appropriate fee for Mabel’s work. The King was very insistent that Mabel be paid fairly with a generous sum. Considering that she was an artisan and he a medieval king, it is remarkable how much attention Henry put to this matter and how much respect he treated Mabel with. She must have truly been uniquely talented in her craft. The King even ordered that she be given the remnants of all precious materials used for the creation of the chasuble.

Westminster Abbey Standard

In 1243, Henry III ordered Mabel to create an embroidered standard that was to be hung adjacent to an altar in Westminster Abbey. This was her second major piece of work for him. Henry III described the iconography he wanted to see, images of St. John and the Virgin adequately embroidered with gold, but he showed immense respect for Mabel’s “artistry and judgment” by allowing her to develop the design and composition independently.

Later years

There are a few theories circulating about what happened to Mabel after the banner was complete for she seemed to disappear from all records for eleven years. She may have “slipped into anonymity” working under someone for this period but because her name had been so distinct prior to this it is not likely that this had happened. More likely than not she finished her period of working in the King’s service and moved out of London to her hometown.

In 1256, Henry was in Bury St. Edmunds and Mabel was brought to his attention. For her services in the creation of “ecclesiastical ornaments” he commanded that she be given “six measures of cloth agreeable to her and the fur of a rabbit for a robe.” This was an immense mark of honor for it was a gift normally granted to abbots and knights. Mabel was an extremely talented embroiderer and as such received the King’s favor and esteem.

References

13th-century English artists
British embroiderers
Artists from Bury St Edmunds
13th-century women artists
13th-century English women